Exile Cinema: Filmmakers at Work beyond Hollywood is a 2009 non-fiction book authored by film critic Michael Atkinson and published by the SUNY Press.

References

2009 non-fiction books
English-language books
American non-fiction books
SUNY Press books
Books of film criticism